Terry Schalk is an American physicist currently Professor Emeritus at University of California, Santa Cruz and an Elected Fellow of the American Association for the Advancement of Science.

Education
Schalk earned his PhD at Iowa State University in 1969.

Research
His interests are accelerator physics, high-energy particle physics , dark energy,  dark matter and astrophysics. His highest cited paper is "Status of the dark energy survey camera (DECam) project" at 112 times, according to Google Scholar.

Publications

References

Year of birth missing (living people)
Living people
Fellows of the American Association for the Advancement of Science
University of California, Santa Cruz faculty
21st-century American physicists
Iowa State University alumni